The New Departure refers to the political strategy used by the Democratic Party in the United States after 1865 to distance itself from its pro-slavery and Copperhead  history in an effort to broaden its political base, and focus on issues where it had more of an advantage, especially economic issues. The New Departure theory also argued that the Fourteenth Amendment and the Fifteenth Amendment had already given women suffrage, but that argument was rejected in state and federal courts.

History
The Democratic Party was the principal party in power in the southern United States, before and during the Civil War (1861–1865) and had supported secessionism, slavery and the Confederate States of America. An even greater liability was the accusation repeated by Republicans that most Democrats had been defeatists during the war and supported Copperhead efforts to lose the war. The Republicans, who claimed to have fought and won the war, saving the Union and abolishing slavery, had the advantage. Radical Republicans hostile to the white South took control of Congress in 1866, stripped ex-Confederates of their power in local affairs, and used the Army to support Republican Parties across the South during Reconstruction. Democrats opposed Radical Reconstruction, but were ineffective.

New Departure
By 1870, many Democrats had stopped opposing Reconstruction and many Republican policies in an effort to improve the fortunes of their party, in a strategy called the "New Departure" of the Democratic Party. Democrats began asserting that they were just as loyal to the United States as the Republicans and now supported some civil rights. Democrats began pushing for economic modernization and recovery, alleging that the Republican-controlled state governments were inefficient and corrupt.  As falling cotton prices further increased economic depression in the South, Democrats attacked the Republicans as creating unwelcome tax burdens and being unable to revive the economy. A prominent example of "New Departure" success was the election as the Governor of Virginia of William E. Cameron and of ex-Confederate general William Mahone as U.S. Senator from Virginia. Both Cameron and Mahone were leaders of the "Readjuster Party", which was a coalition of Democrats, Republicans and African Americans who sought the reduction of Virginia's pre-war debt. In Tennessee, "Redeemer" Democrats supported the Republican governor DeWitt Senter.

Georgia
Georgia Democrats called their program the New Departure starting in 1872, when they regained full control of the state government. The Party was conservative on issues of race, and vigorously promoted the Henry Grady's New South dream of promoting economic modernization through business, railroads, banking, merchandising, and industry. The New Departure policy made Georgia's reconciliation with the business community in the north easier, and facilitated northern investments in the state. The era ended in 1890, when the Farmers' Alliance captured the Democratic Party.

Ohio
On May 18, 1871, Democrats of Montgomery County, Ohio met in convention in Dayton to appoint delegates to the state convention on June 1, 1871. The members of their Committee on Resolutions were Clement Vallandigham, Dr. A. Geiger, David A. Houk, Dr. John Kemp, John A. McMahon, Adam Clay, and George V. Naureth.  The New Departure resolution of fifteen points was adopted.  The resolution called for abandoning Civil War issues of the Democratic Party "thus burying out of sight all that is of the dead past, namely, the right of secession, slavery, inequality before the law, and political inequality; and further, now that reconstruction is complete, and representation within the Union restored to all the States" and affirmed states' rights. It "opposed to all attempts at centralisation and consolidation of power in the hands of the General Government" and advocated "to secure universal political rights and equality among both the white and the colored people of the United States". The resolution called for "payment of the public debt at the earliest practicable moment consistent with moderate taxation" and to "make the burdens of taxation equal, uniform, and just" with "adequate reform in the civil service". For government finances, "a strictly revenue tariff" was advocated, along with "all taxation ought to be based on wealth instead of population . . . That specie is the basis of all sound currency, and that the policy requires as speedy a return to that basis as is practicable without distress to the debtor-class The resolution stated "there is no necessary or irrepressible conflict between labor and capital. The policy on land grants was: "we are totally and resolutely opposed to the grant of any more of the public lands . . . holding that these lands ought to be devoted as homesteads to actual settlers, or sold in small quantities to individuals at a price so low as to induce speedy occupation and settlement." It advocated "holding still to the good old Democratic doctrine of annexation or acquisition of territory, The "Bayonet Bill" and the "Ku-Klux Bill" passed by Congress were opposed on the grounds of "intermeddling with the exclusively local concerns of every State. The resolution concluded with a statement "that the Radical party of 1871 as now constituted is not the Republican party . . . it deserves the emphatic condemnation of the people."

The New Departure policy of Ohio Democrats was endorsed by Salmon P. Chase on May 20, 1871.

The resolution may, or may not have been the origins of the New Departure policy of the Democratic Party.

Criticism and opposition
The "New Departure" was strongly opposed by large factions of Democrats in the Deep South, who professed loyalty to the Confederate legacy. Republicans attacked the Democrats as being insincere about reform, committed to states' rights at the expense of national unity and to white supremacy at the expense of civil rights.

References

Further reading
 De Santis, Vincent P. Republicans Face the Southern Question — The New Departure Years, 1877–1897 (1959)
 Edward Gambill, Conservative Ordeal: Northern Democrats and Reconstruction, 1865-1868 (1981)
 Summers, Mark Wahlgren. A dangerous stir: fear, paranoia, and the making of Reconstruction (2009)
 Woodward, C.  Vann.  The Origins of the New South, 1877-1913 (1951)

Democratic Party (United States)
Reconstruction Era